James "J. D." DePree, also known as Jim DePree, (March 14, 1879 – July 1, 1972) was an American football player and coach of football and baseball. He was the fifth head coach for the University of Tennessee Volunteers football team, coaching the 1905 and 1906 seasons and compiling a record of 4–11–3. While at Tennessee, he started the school's first basketball team and coached the baseball team in 1906.

Depree married Fannie Wilson of Knoxville, Tennessee, who bore his three sons. He was born in Holland, Michigan in 1879 and died in Sarasota, Florida in 1972.

DePree was a letterman in football from the University of Michigan, where played fullback.

Head coaching record

Football

References 

1879 births
1972 deaths
American football fullbacks
Michigan Wolverines football players
Tennessee Volunteers baseball coaches
Tennessee Volunteers football coaches
People from Holland, Michigan